Francesca P. Albanese (born 1977) is an international lawyer and academic, an Italian national with two young children. She was elected Special Rapporteur on the occupied Palestinian territories for a three-year term, renewable for a further three years.

An Affiliate Scholar at the Institute for the Study of International Migration at Georgetown University and Senior Advisor on Migration and Forced Displacement at the non-profit Arab Renaissance for Democracy and Development. Widely published and has also worked as a human rights expert for the United Nations, including the Office of the UN High Commissioner for Human Rights and the UN Relief and Work Agency for Palestine Refugees.

On 18 October 2022, Albanese recommended in her first report that UN member states develop "a plan to end the Israeli settler-colonial occupation and apartheid regime" and concluded that "The violations described in the present report expose the nature of the Israeli occupation, that of an intentionally acquisitive, segregationist and repressive regime designed to prevent the realization of the Palestinian people’s right to self-determination".

Her appointment as Special Rapporteur on the occupied Palestinian territories generated controversy due to her past statements regarding the Holocaust and the Jewish lobby, which some have accused of being antisemitic in nature. In December 2022, sixty-five scholars of anti-Semitism, Holocaust and Jewish Studies stated: "It is evident that the campaign against [Albanese] is not about combating today's antisemitism. It is essentially about efforts to silence her and to undermine her mandate as a senior UN official reporting about Israel's violations of human rights and international law." A statement by 116 human rights and civil society organizations, academic institutions, and groups lauded Albanese's "tireless efforts toward the protection of human rights in the OPT and in raising awareness of the alarming daily violations of Palestinian rights". In February 2023, a bipartisan group of 18 members of the United States Congress called for Albanese to be removed from her position claiming that she has demonstrated a consistent bias against Israel.

Book 
2020 Palestinian Refugees in International Law with Lex Takkenberg

External links 
Mandate and holder

References

1977 births
Living people